S.O.S. is a 1999 Norwegian-Italian comedy film directed by Thomas Robsahm. It won the 2000 Amanda Award for best film.

Cast 
 Gianmarco Tognazzi - Angelo
 Jacqueline Lustig - Alba
 Kjersti Holmen - Ellen
 Ricky Memphis - Police Officer

References

External links 

1999 comedy films
1999 films
Italian comedy films
Norwegian comedy films